The 2022–23 North West Counties Football League season is the 41st in the history of the North West Counties Football League, a football competition in England, and the fifth season following the split of the lower level into two geographically separated divisions. Teams are divided into three divisions: Premier Division, at Step 5, and Divisions One North and South, at Step 6.

The allocations for Steps 5 and 6 this season were announced by The Football Association on 12 May 2022, and are subject to appeals and FA ratification.

Premier Division

The Premier Division comprises 22 teams, 18 of which competed in the previous season. 

The following three clubs left the Premier Division before the season:
 Macclesfield – promoted to the Northern Premier League
 Runcorn Town – relegated to Division One North
 Skelmersdale United – promoted to the Northern Premier League

The following four clubs joined the Premier Division before the season:
 Bury AFC – promoted from Division One North
 FC Isle of Man – promoted from Division One South
 Kendal Town – relegated from the Northern Premier League
 West Didsbury & Chorlton – promoted from Division One South

Premier Division table
Prior to the first match(es) being played the Pos column shows alphanumeric sequence of teams rather than league position.

Stadia and locations

Division One North

Division One North comprises 18 clubs, 15 of which were in the division the previous season.

The following four clubs left Division One North before the season:
 Bury AFC – promoted to the Premier Division
 Campion – transferred back to the Northern Counties East League
 Golcar United – promoted to the Northern Counties East League
 St Helens Town – relegated to the Liverpool County Premier League

The following three clubs joined Division One North before the season:
 Euxton Villa – promoted from the West Lancashire League
 FC St Helens – promoted from the Cheshire League
 Runcorn Town – relegated from the Premier Division

Division One North table
Prior to the first match(es) being played the Pos column shows alphabetic sequence of teams rather than league position.

Stadia and locations

Division One South

Division One South comprises 20 clubs, 17 of which were in the division the previous season.

The following three clubs left Division One South before the season:
 FC Isle of Man – promoted to the Premier Division
 St Martins – relegated to the West Midlands (Regional) League
 West Didsbury & Chorlton – promoted to the Premier Division

The following three clubs joined Division One South before the season:
 Ashville – promoted from the West Cheshire League
 Foley Meir – promoted from the Staffordshire County Senior League
 Stockport Georgians – promoted from the Manchester League

Division One South table
Prior to the first match(es) being played the Pos column shows alphabetic sequence of teams rather than league position.

Stadia and locations

References

External links 
 The Official Website of The North West Counties League

North West Counties Football League seasons
9